This is a list of foreign players in Primera División de Fútbol Profesional. This a list of foreign players who have played in the Primera División de Fútbol Profesional since the beginning of the Apertura/Clausura format in 1998. For a list of foreign players who have played prior to the inception of the Apertura/Clausura format then check out Foreign Players (1926–1998).

The following players:
have played at least one official game for their respective clubs.
are listed as squad members for the current Clausura 2015 Season.
have not been capped for the El Salvador national team at any level.
includes uncapped players with dual nationality.

In italic: Players currently signed, but have yet to play a league match.

In Bold: Current foreign Primera División de Fútbol Profesional. players and their present team.

with *: Players who have represented their national team at a senior level.

Naturalized Players 
  Arturo Albarran – Alianza F.C., C.D. Águila, Atlético Marte, UES
  Washington de la Cruz - Santa Clara, Alianza F.C.
   Cristian Esnal - Juventud Independiente, UES
  Elder José Figueroa – C.D. Vista Hermosa, Atlético Balboa, Alianza F.C., Once Municipal, C.D. FAS, San Salvador F.C.
  Shawn Martin – C.D. Águila, A.D. Isidro Metapán
  Dustin Corea - C.D. FAS
  Richard Menjívar - C.D. Águila
  Gerson Mayen – C.D. FAS, Santa Tecla
  Carlos Menjívar – C.D. FAS, C.D. Águila, Once Municipal, A.D. Isidro Metapán, Limeno, Juventud Independiente
  Derby Carrillo – Santa Tecla
  Junior Burgos - FAS
  Marcelo Messias – C.D. Águila, C.D. FAS, C.D. Chalatenango, A.D. Isidro Metapán, Alianza F.C.
  Nildeson -  Luis Ángel Firpo, C.D. Chalatenango, C.D. Águila, Atletico Balboa
  Emiliano Pedrozo - Santa Clara, FAS,  Atlético Marte, San Salvador,  Águila, Luis Ángel Firpo, Isidro Metapán, Nejapa
  Celio Rodríguez – C.D. Luis Ángel Firpo, El Roble
  Vladan Vićević – C.D. Águila
  Faisal Bisharat - Atlético Marte

Africa – CAF

Burundi  
 Elias Dandi – Isidro Metapan

Cameroon  
 Van Sebastian  – Dragon (1999)
 Ban Ban Karim – Limeno
 Ayukokata També Ndip- Metapan

Equatorial Guinea  
 Deogracias Abaga Edu Mangue – Atlético Marte

Gabon  
 Didier Ovono (*) – Alianza

Ghana  
 Emanuel Bentil – Isidro Metapan
 James Owusu-Ansah – Once Municipal, Atlético Marte, Firpo
 Mathius Mendy – Once Municipal
 Mohammed Issahaku – FAS

Nigeria  
 Augustine Jibrin – Juventud Independiente
 Agustine Nwoko  – Once Municipal
 Fredrick Ogangan - C.D. Municipal Limeno, Jocoro F.C., Independiente, C.D. Luis Angel Firpo

Sierra Leone  
 Yussuf Sindeh – FAS

South Africa  
 Mothar Kante Kabu – Dragon

Togo  
 Fabinho (*) – Aguila, San Salvador F.C., Isidro Metapan

Asia – Asian Football Confederation

Japan  

 Sergio Escudero – Atlético Marte

South America – CONMEBOL

Argentina
 Lucas Abraham – C.D. FAS, Juventud Independiente, San Salvador F.C.
 Luis Acuña - Aguila, Jocoro F.C.
 Agustin Adorni – Alianza, Pasaquina, Atletico Marte
 Pedro Aguirrez – FAS
 Mateo Ahmed – FAS
 Juan Aimar – FAS, Santa Tecla F.C., Platense
 Diego Rafael Álvarez – Firpo, Isidro Metapan, Chalatenango
 Gabriel Alvarez – San Luis Talpa
 Martín Álvarez - Chalatenango
 Sergio Leonel Álvarez – Limeno
 Héctor Amarilla – Aguila
 Santiago Autino – FAS
 Patricio Barroche – Firpo, C.D. Vista Hermosa, Aguila
 Andrés Bazzano – A.D. Isidro Metapán
 Álvaro Bely – C.D. Dragón
 Alejandro de la Cruz Bentos – FAS, Nejapa F.C.
 Sebastián Bini – FAS
 Martín Boasso – FAS
 David Boquín - Sonsonate, Once Deportivo
 Fulgencio Deonel Bordón – C.D. Aguila
 Rodrigo de Brito – Santa Tecla F.C., Firpo, Limeno
 Leandro Cabral – C.D. Pasaquina
 Brian Calabrese - Aguila
 Bruno Camilletti – Santa Tecla F.C.
 Walter Capozuchi – San Luis Talpa, ADET
 Roberto Carboni – C.D. Luis Ángel Firpo
 Esteban Omar Cárdenas – A.D. Isidro Metapán
 Pedro Cardozo – C.D. Aguila
 Ramiro Cepeda – San Luis Talpa
 Roberto Armando Chanampe – C.D. Chalatenango, Nejapa F.C.
 Omar Axel Clazon – C.D. Aguila
 Adrián Colazo – C.D. Aguila
 Matías Coloca – FAS
 Ignacio Colombo – Santa Tecla F.C.
 Luis Darío Calvo - San Salvador F.C.
 Jorge Córdoba  – Alianza F.C.
 Matías Córdoba – Alianza F.C.
 Julián Di Cosmo – C.D. FAS
 Mario Costas – Firpo
 Alejandro Cuneo – Firpo
 Santiago Davio – UES
 Alberto Diz – Once Municipal
 Jorge Drovandi – Alianza F.C.
 Carlos Daniel Escalante – Juventud Independiente, Once Municipal, Independiente Nacional 1906, C.D. Municipal Limeño, C.D. FAS, Aguila, San Salvador F.C.
 Eduardo Escobar – Alianza F.C.
 Carlos Escudero jnr – Santa Tecla F.C.
 Matías Fernández – Firpo
 Gustavo Fuentes – Alianza F.C.
 Juan Ignacio Fuliana – A.D. Isidro Metapán
 Alejandro Gagliardi – Santa Tecla F.C.
 Cecilio Galeano – Alianza F.C.
 Patricio Gallardo – Once Municipal
 Fernando Gallo – C.D. Sonsonate
 Jorge Leonardo Garay – C.D. Dragón
 Gabriel Eduardo Giacopetti - Platense
 Ariel Giles – C.D. FAS
 Martín Giménez – Santa Tecla F.C.
 Carlos Alberto Del Giorno – C.D. Pasaquina, C.D. Municipal Limeño, Jocoro F.C.
 Carlos Alberto Gómez – A.D. Isidro Metapán
 Wilson Gómez – FAS
 Alan Leonel González - C.D. Chalatenango
 Ariel Leonel González – Alianza F.C.
 Diego González – UES
 Marcelo Gonzales – Aguila
 Juan Carlos Graf – Firpo
 Gonzalo Gravano – Alianza F.C.
 Fernando Gutierrez - C.D. Municipal Limeño
 Leonardo Incoruala – A.D. Isidro Metapán
 Marcos Ielpo – Aguila (1999)
 Sergio Ibarra – Aguila
 Gabriel Kinjo – Municipal Limeno (2003)
 Francisco Ladogano – UES
 Rodrigo Lagos – San Salvador F.C., A.D. Isidro Metapán
 Bryan Lanzeni – C.D. Dragón
 Agustín Lastagaray – FAS
 Fernando Leguizamon – Firpo
 Pablo Leguizamo – Atletico Marte
 Jonathan Lezcano – FAS
 Manuel Lucero – C.D. Pasaquina
 Gabriel Lučić – Aguila
 Horacio Lugo – Alianza F.C.
 Damián Óscar Luna – Aguila 
 Adrián Mahía – Aguila
 Juan Ignaio Mare - Once Deportivo
 Facundo Martínez – FAS
 Maximiliano Martinez - C.D. Chalatenango
 Nicolas Martinez - Aguila
 Leandro Martin - Isidro Metapan
 Gonzalo Mazzia – Atletico Marte, C.D. FAS
 Gustavo Mhamed – C.D. Municipal Limeno
 Matías Milozzi- Once Municipal
 Allan Muraldo – C.D. Dragón, Firpo', C.D. FAS
 Luca Orozco – Isidro Metapan
 Diego Oyarbide – Isidro Metapan
 Diego Passarelli – Alianza F.C.
 Leonardo Pekarnik – Firpo
 Ruben Dario Perez – Santa Tecla F.C.
 Joel Perucci – Firpo
 Guillermo Pfund – Firpo
 Jonathan Philippe – Alianza F.C.
 Cristian Sánchez Prette – Aguila, Audaz
 Andrés Puig – Atletico Marte
 Luciano Quinteros – Arcense
 Alexi Ramos – A.D. Isidro Metapán
 Lucas Rivero - UES
 Iván Rocca - C.D. Chalatenango
 Lucas Rocco – Santa Tecla F.C.
 Eloy Rodríguez – Santa Tecla F.C.
 Mariano Rodríguez – C.D. Dragón
 Maximiliano Morales Roldán – Firpo
 Diego De Rosa – Alianza F.C.
 Sebastian Rudman – Firpo
 Daniel Rui – Atletico Marte
 Jeremías Ruíz - Limeno
 Víctor Hugo Sánchez – Atletico Balboa, Arcense
 Luciano Sanhuezo - Independiente
 Dante Segovia – Limeno
 Martín Claudio Sosa – Alianza F.C.
 Facundo Simioli – Santa Tecla F.C.', C.D. FAS
 Guillermo Stradella – FAS
 Luciano Suárez  – A.D. Isidro Metapán
 Franco Toloza – C.D. Aguila
 Pablo Troyano – Once Municipal
 Martín Uranga – Arcense
 Juan La Vaca – Arcense
 Gustavo Vecchiarelli – A.D. Isidro Metapán
 Carlos Verdugo – C.D. Aguila
 Guillermo Vernetti – A.D. Isidro Metapán
 Lucas Vico – FAS
 Alejandro Villani - C.D. Chalatenango
 Maximiliano Alexis Villega – J. Independiente
 Mariano Villegas – C.D. Aguila
 José Vizcarra  – C.D. Aguila
 Cristian Javier Zamudio – A.D. Isidro Metapán
 Juan Zandoná – Alianza F.C.

Brazil
 Alan Abdalá – C.D. Sonsonate
 Juliano de Andrade – Alianza F.C., C.D. Luis Ángel Firpo
 José Rogeiro Antunes – C.D. Luis Ángel Firpo
 Carlos Regis Araujo – Once Municipal
 Alyson Batista – C.D. Águila, Juventud Independiente
 Anderson Passos Batista – A.D. Isidro Metapán, Once Lobos
 Alemán Bor-man – C.D. FAS
 Weslley Braz De Almeida – Atletico Marte
 José Caicedo – C.D. Dragón
 Mauro Caju – C.D. Luis Ángel Firpo
 Ronaille Calheira – C.D. Águila
 Moisés Canalonga – C.D. Dragón
 Alex Carioca – Alianza F.C.
 Augusto Do Carmo – C.D. Sonsonate, UES
 Juliano De Carvalho – Atlético Marte
 Ricardo Correia – C.D. FAS
 Luís Rómulo de Castro – C.D. Águila
 Junio Pinto – A.D. Isidro Metapán
 Heslley Couto – C.D. Águila
 Daniel Cruz – Once Municipal
 Pablo Damasco – C.D Santiagueño
 Marcelo Domínguez – C.D. Chalatenango
 Dimas – Once Municipal
 Wanderson Silveiro Echeverría – Santa Tecla F.C.
 Eber – C.D. Luis Ángel Firpo
 Leonardo Ferreira - A.D. Isidro Metapán
 Osvaldo Dasilva Filho – Santa Tecla F.C.
 Leandro Lourenço Franco – C.D. Águila, C.D. Luis Ángel Firpo
 Elenilson Ferreira Garcia -  C.D. Sonsonate
 Evandro Guimaraes – C.D. Dragón
 Itacaré - UES
 Glaucio lira – C.D. Águila
 Jackson – C.D. Dragon, C.D. Sonsonate, C.D. Pasaquina
 Luiz Carlos Caetano Júnior – C.D. Águila
 Bruno Kairon  – C.D. Águila
 Allan Kardeck – A.D. Isidro Metapán
 Alexandre Pinto Larangueira – C.D. Águila
 José Laurindo – C.D. Luis Ángel Firpo
 Paulo César Rodrigues Lima – C.D. FAS, San Salvador F.C., C.D. Municipal Limeno, Juventud Independiente, C.D. Luis Angel Firpo
 Ricardo de Lima – C.D. Águila
 Emerson Reis Luiz – C.D. FAS
 Alex Norival Machado – Atlético Marte
 Yan Maciel  – C.D. Águila
 Lucas Marcal – C.D. Águila, Once Municipal
 Marcelo Marquez – Municipal Limeno
 Alexandro Martin – Alianza F.C.
 Rodinei Martins – C.D. Águila
 Ricardo Mamboré – C.D. Luis Ángel Firpo
 Jose Eduardo Mendez – C.D. Chalatenango, C.D. Vista Hermosa
 Josielson Moraes – C.D. Dragón
 Josimar Moreira – C.D. FAS, C.D. Sonsonate
 Marlon Da Silva de Moura – C.D. Águila
 Gustavo Mendes Nunez – Alianza F.C., A.D. Isidro Metapán
 Mauro Nunez – C.D. Águila
 Agnaldo Oliveira – Alianza F.C.
 Alessandro De Oliveira – Once Municipal
 Danilo Oliveira – Once Municipal
 Marco De Oliveira – C.D. Dragón
 Paulo De Oliveira – C.D. Chalatenango
 Roberto Oliveira – Atlético Balboa
 Zé Paulo -  C.D. Sonsonate, A.D. Isidro Metapán, C.D. Municipal Limeno
 Elvis Pererira – Atlético Balboa
 Luis Sergio Pereira – Atlético Balboa, C.D. Dragón
 Marco Antonio Pereira – C.D. Dragón
 Severino Piñeiro  – C.D. Águila
 Daniel Alexander Prediguer  – C.D. Águila, Atletico Balboa
 Roberto Ramos – C.D. Municipal Limeno
 Ricardinho – Santa Tecla F.C., Isidro Metapán, Atletico Narte
 Alessandro Rodríguez – Isidro Metapán, Atletico Balboa
 Joao Do Rosario – Isidro Metapán
 Marcio Sampaio  – C.D. Águila
 Mauricio Do Santos – C.D. Luis Ángel Firpo
 Cleber Lucas dos Santos – C.D. Dragon
 Lucas Dos Santos – A.D. Isidro Metapán
 Noé Dos Santos – A.D. Isidro Metapán
 Tiago dos Santos Roberto – C.D. Aguila
 Toninho Dos Santos – C.D. Aguila
 Anderson da Silva – C.D. Aguila
 Ever Da Silva – C.D. Luis Ángel Firpo
 Fabricio Da Silva – Juventud Independiente
 Glauber Rodrigues da Silva – C.D. FAS
 Glauber da Silva – Atlético Marte, C.D. Águila, Once Municipal, C.D. Pasaquina
 Jorge Da Silva – Juventud Independiente
 Klayton da Silva – UES
 Leonardo Da Silva – C.D. Vista Hermosa, Alianza F.C., A.D. Isidro Metapán
 Pio Da Silva – C.D. Luis Ángel Firpo
 Reynaldo Da Silva – UES
 Roberto da Silva – C.D. Dragon
 Raphael Alves da Silva – UES
 Thiago Monteiro Accioli Da Silva – C.D. Luis Ángel Firpo
 Wesley Tanque Da Silva – C.D. Luis Ángel Firpo
 Marco Soarez – C.D. FAS
 Benvenutti de Souza - A.D. Isidro Metapán
 Ducivan De Sousa – C.D. Dragon
 José Oliveira de Souza – C.D. Águila, C.D. Municipal Limeño, Alianza F.C., Firpo
 Alves Dos Santos(Sassá) - C.D. Sonsonate
 Willer Souza – Alianza F.C.
 Sandro Machado Tavares  – C.D. Aguila
 Marcio Teruel – C.D. FAS
 Jimmy Vargas (Djimi Vargas)  – C.D. Aguila
 André Luiz Vasconcelos - Firpo
 Gabriel Ventura  - Firpo
 Lucas Ventura  – C.D. Aguila
 Flavio Viana – UES
  Andre Luiz Vieira  – C.D. Aguila
 Valtinho – Juventud Independiente
 Felipe Ximenez – C.D. FAS
 Sandro Luís Zamboni  – Alianza F.C.

Chile
 Ramón Ávila – Firpo
 Felipe Brito – Firpo
 Luis Cabezas - Chalatenango
 Sebastián Julio – Firpo
 Álvaro López - FAS
 Juan Carlos Madrid – Alianza
 Juan Márquez - Acajutla 
 Jhon Novoa – Alianza
 Juan José Ossandón – Alianza
 Moisés Rivera - Santa Clara
 Raúl Toro – Firpo, Alianza, Atlético Marte
 Carlos Verdugo – Águila

Colombia
 Mario Alberto Abadía – C.D. FAS, Juventud Independiente
 Jerson Steven Aguilar - C.D. Audaz
 Argenis Alba - Atletico Marte
 Alonso Alcibar – A.D. Isidro Metapán
 Yohan Ambuila – C.D. Pasaquina
 Carlos Fernando Angulo - C.D. Chalatenango
 Andres Angulo - Metapan
 Luis Angulo - Dragon
 Mario Sergio Angulo – C.D. Dragon
 Gabriel Antero – C.D. Águila
 Robinson Aponzá - C.D. Municipal Limeño 
 Luis Arboleda - C.D. Chalatenango
 Victor Arboleda - Alianza F.C.
 Yair Arboleda - Municipal Limeno, Dragon
 Eder Arias – C.D. Águila, Firpo, Chalatenango
 Franco Arizala - Alianza F.C.
 Wilber Arizala - Platense
 Carlos Asprilla * – Atlético Balboa
 Luis Carlos Asprilla – Atlético Balboa, Once Municipal, San Salvador F.C., A.D. Isidro Metapán, C.D. Municipal Limeño
 Nestor Asprilla – Atletico Marte
 Victor Balanta – Atlético Balboa
 Yoan Ballesteros – Atletico Marte
 Julian Barragan – San Salvador F.C.
 Ronald Benavides - Once Deportivo
 Mario Benítez – C.D. Luis Ángel Firpo
 Mahecha Bermúdez – C.D. Luis Ángel Firpo
 Oswaldo Blanco - Alianza F.C.
 Daniel Buitrago - C.D. Sonsonate
 Faider Fabio Burbano – C.D. Aguila
 Fránklin Cabezas – Alianza F.C.
 James Cabezas – C.D. Águila, C.D. Municipal Limeño
 Gustavo Cabrera – Firpo, San Salvador F.C.
 Gersain Caicedo - Audaz, A.D. Isidro Metapán
 Heiner Caicedo – Firpo
 José Fabio Caicedo – C.D. Dragon
 Ederson Buendía Canoles – C.D. Luis Ángel Firpo
  Libardo Carvajal – C.D. Arcense, C.D. Chalatenango, Once Lobos, Once Municipal
 Henry Castillo - C.D. Luis Ángel Firpo
 Jhon Castillo – C.D. Dragon, C.D. Vista Hermosa, Alianza F.C., UES
 Carlos Ceballos – UES
 Luis José Pérez Charriz – Juventud Independiente
 Juan Pablo Chacon – C.D. Luis Ángel Firpo, Once Municipal, San Salvador F.C.
 Jhony Moran Chan – Atletico Marte, Chalatenango
 Edilson Chávez – C.D. Arcense
 Jeferson Collazos - C.D. FAS 
 Harold Contreras – C.D. Dragon
 Beitar Córdoba - C.D. Sonsonate, C.D. Municipal Limeño
 Rodolfo Córdoba – C.D. FAS
 Giribeth Cotes – C.D. Aguila
 Julián Cruz – Atlético Balboa
 Luis Cuesta Col – Atletico Marte
 Juan Camilio Delgado - Platense, Alianza, Jocoro
 Bladimir Díaz – C.D. Chalatenango, Alianza F.C., FAS
 Briand Andrés Díaz - Platense
 Alexis Fernando Díaz – Juventud Independiente
 Juan David Díaz- Juventud Independiente
 Peter Dominguez – C.D. Chalatenango
 Eliécer Espinosa - C.D. Municipal Limeno
 Walter Escobar * – C.D. FAS
 Yílmar Filigrana – C.D. FAS
 Yuberney Franco – C.D. Dragon
 Marcó Tulio Gallego - Once Deportivo
 John Gamboa – C.D. Dragon
 Orlando Garces – San Salvador F.C.
 Felix Garcia – Juventud Independiente
 John Jairo García – C.D. Chalatenango
 Martin Garcia – Alianza F.C., Atletico Marte
 Norman García – Luis Angel Firpo
 Iván Garrido – Alianza F.C.
 Bryan Gil - C.D. FAS
 Christian Gil – C.D. Chalatenango
 Andrés Giraldo – Juventud Independiente
 Camilo Gómez - Independiente
 Christian Gonzales – C.D. FAS
 Cristian Adolfo González – UES, Juventud Independiente
 Fredy Gonzales – C.D. Sonsonate
 Nito Gonzales – C.D. Arcense, Atletico Balboa, C.D. Municipal Limeno, Once Lobos
 Tardelis Peña González - Audaz, Independiente, Luis Angel Firpo, Atletico Marte
 Oscar Guerrero – Alianza F.C.
 William Guerrero – C.D. Sonsonate, UES
 Yerson Gutiérrez - Isidro Metapan
 Wílmar Hernández – C.D. Chalatenango
 Carlos Daniel Hidalgo – C.D. Sonsonate
 Diomer Hinestroza - El Vencedor
 Jhoaho Hinestroza - Isidro Metapan
 Luis Hinestroza – Santa Tecla F.C., Alianza F.C.
 Yair Ibargüen – C.D. Aguila
 Jairo Hurtado Izquierda – Once Municipal, C.D. FAS
 Bernardo Jaramillo – San Salvador F.C.
 Victor Jaramillo – Once Municipal, C.D. Chalatenango
 Victor Landazuri - Platense, Alianza, Santa Tecla F.C.
 Miller Lazarazo – Atletico Marte
 Héctor Lemus – Dragon
 Dilan Esteban Lloreda - C.D. Pasaquina
 Eisner Loboa  - C.D. Municipal Limeño 
 Dorian López – C.D. Atlético Balboa
 James López – C.D. Aguila
 Mike López – Metapan
 Alexander Lugo – C.D. Chalatenango
 Victor Hugo Malfa – C.D. FAS, C.D. Chalatenango, San Salvador F.C.
 Camilo Mancilla – Alianza
 John Marulanda – Alianza
 Andres Medina – San Salvador F.C., Nejapa F.C., Once Municipal, Atlético Balboa, Once Municipal
 Juan Camilo Mejía – C.D. Chalatenango, C.D. Vista Hermosa, Once Municipal, C.D. Águila
 Stiver Mena – Alianza
 Yessy Mina - Santa Tecla F.C.
 Mauricio Mendoza – C.D. FAS, C.D. Chalatenango
 Gabriel Menjumea – Alianza
 Gerson Mier – C.D. Arcense, C.D. Municipal Limeño (2003)
 Oscar Movil – C.D. Sonsonate, C.D. Municipal Limeno
 Miguel Potes Mina – Once Municipal
 John Machado – C.D. Dragon, El Vencedor, Isidro Metapan, Jocoro F.C., Platense, Atletico Marte
 Luis Marines – C.D. Dragon
 Edgar Medrano - Once Deportivo, Aguila
 Daley Mena - Audaz, Alianza, Sonsonate, Once Deportivo
 Michell Mercado - El Vencedor, Alianza F.C.
 Neymer Miranda – Pasaquina, Once Deportivo, El Vencedor
 Hermes Martínez Misal -C.D. Chalatenango, C.D. Águila, San Salvador F.C., C.D. Luis Ángel Firpo, Alianza F.C.
 Andrés Molina  – C.D. Dragon
 Jose Mondragon - C.D. Sonsonate
 Edgar Montaño – Santa Clara, Alianza F.C.
 Jhon Montaño - Dragon
 Victor Hugo Montaño  – C.D. FAS
 Kevin Moreno - Dragon
 Oscar Morera – C.D. Aguila
 Arbey Mosquera - Metapan
 Carlos Mosquera – Alianza
 Eider Mosquera – Independiente Nacional 1906
 Elkin Mosquera - C.D. Chalatenango
 Juan Carlos Mosquera  – C.D. Dragon, Atletico Balboa, Alianza F.C.
 Cristian Ali Gil Mosquera – C.D. Atlético Balboa, C.D. Vista Hermosa, San Salvador F.C., C.D. Municipal Limeño, Atletico Marte, UES
 Álvaro Mota – San Salvador F.C.
 Manuel Murrillo - Municipal Limeno
 Miguel Angel Murillo'' – Alianza
 Miguel Murillo - Municipal Limeno
 Yeison Murillo – Alianza F.C., Metapan
 Jair Muñoz – Alianza
 Mario Muñoz – Alianza
 Alexander Obregón – San Salvador F.C., C.D. Chalatenango, C.D. FAS, C.D. Luis Angel Firpo, Independiente Nacional 1906
 Brayan Obregon - Santa Tecla F.C.
 Libardo Carbajal Orobio – Once Municipal
 Marcelo Rojas Ospina – Atletico Marte
 William Palacio - Municipal Limeno
 Hugo Palacios – Alianza
 Jackson Palacios - Jocoro F.C.
 Kelvin Palacios – Juventud Independiente
 Luis Palacios - C.D. Pasaquina
 Maikon Palacios – Firpo
 Wilson Palacios – C.D. Chalatenango
 Yohalin Palacios – C.D. Chalatenango, Jocoro F.C., Dragon
 Carlos Parra – Atletico Marte
 Yerson Paz – San Salvador F.C.
 Roberto Carlos Peña – C.D. FAS
  Tardelius Pena  - Firpo, Atletico Marte
 Raúl Peñaranda – Alianza, C.D. FAS, Firpo
 Luis Arturo Peralta - C.D. FAS, Atletico Marte, Isidro Metapan
 Luis Alberto Perea - C.D. FAS 
 Nilson Pérez – Firpo
 Cristian Pinzón- C.D. Dragon
 Diego Pizarro – Alianza
 Boris Yasser Polo - El Vencedor
 John Edward Polo – C.D. Arcense, Atletico Balboa
 Alonso Umaña Popo - C.D. Audaz, Firpo, Once Deportivo
 Pablo Quandt – FAS
 Andrés Quejada – Aguila, Atletico Marte, Santa Tecla
 Teobaldo Quezada – FAS
 Jeison Quiñones - C.D. Pasaquina, C.D. FAS, Once Deportivo
 Yosimar Quiñónez - Santa Tecla F.C., Municipal Limeno
 José Ramírez – Aguila
 Edgar Ramos * – Alianza F.C.
 Jose Luis Ramos – A.D. Isidro Metapán
 Carlos Rendón – C.D. FAS
 Franklin Rengifo – Firpo
 Hector Renteria - C.D. Chalatenango
 Marcelino Renterí – Alianza
 Nixon Restrepo – Juventud Independiente
 Duvier Riascos – Alianza
 Jhonny Riascos – C.D. Dragon
 Steven Riascos - Firpo
 Jhony Rios – C.D. Dragon, C.D. Aguila, Firpo, Municipal Limeno, A.D. Isidro Metapan
 Francisco Rivera – San Salvador F.C.
 Ruben Dario Robledo – C.D. Chalatenango
 Eduardo Steven Rodríguez - C.D. Audaz,  C.D. Chalatenango, Independiente, Atletico Marte,  Santa Tecla F.C.
 Luis Torres Rodríguez – C.D. Vista Hermosa, Atlético Balboa, Firpo, San Salvador F.C.
 Santiago Rodríguez – Atletico Balboa
 Julio Romana – C.D. Aguila
 Carlos Salazar - C.D. Chalatenango, Isidro Metapan
 Juan Camilo Salazar – C.D. FAS
 Wilber Sanchez – San Salvador F.C.
 Wilson Sanchez – Isidro Metapan, Atlético Marte, C.D. Vista Hermosa
 Jorge Sandoval – Alianza, C.D. Municipal Limeño, C.D. Chalatenango, San Salvador F.C.
 John Carlos Serna  – Alianza
 Francisco Serrano – C.D. Aguila
 Henry Sevillano – C.D. Luis Ángel Firpo, C.D. Chalatenango
 Jaime Sierra - C.D. Aguila
 Santiago Rodríguez Silva – Atlético Balboa
 Miguel Solís – Independiente Nacional 1906, Once Municipal, UES, C.D. Chalatenango
 Herlbert Enrique Soto – Alianza
 Edier Tello - C.D. Luis Ángel Firpo
 Max Torres – C.D. Luis Ángel Firpo
 Yhoner Toro – Alianza
 Pablo Vacca – Firpo
 Carlos Urrego – C.D. Dragon
 Luis Fernando Valencia  – C.D. Dragon
 Jimmy Valoyes – C.D. Dragon, C.D. Aguila
 Juan Jose Vasquez - Once Deportivo
 Juan Guillermo Vélez - Firpo
 Francisco Villalba – San Salvador F.C.
 Carlos Villarreal – C.D. Municipal Limeño
 Hugo Viveros – C.D. Municipal Limeño
 Jefferson Viveros – C.D. FAS, Juventud Independiente, C.D. Municipal Limeño, C.D. Dragon, A.D. Isidro Metapán
 Fernando Zuleta – C.D. Aguila

Ecuador
 Javier Angulo – Once Municipal
 Joe Arboleda - Chalatenango
 Tomás Arboleda – C.D. Dragón
 Eber Caicedo - Firpo
 Carlos Castañeda – C.D. Dragón
 Dany Cetre - Chalatenango
 Moisés Cuero – Once Municipal
 André Hurtado - Chalatenango
 Fausto Klinger – C.D. Municipal Limeno
 Richard Mercado - C.D. Aguila
 Eder Moscoso - C.D. FAS, Jocoro F.C., Chalatenango
 Henry Rua - A.D. Isidro Metapan
 Fabio Zuniga – C.D. Dragón

Paraguay
 David Leonardo Alcaraz - C.D. Sonsonate
 Edgar Osvaldo Alvarez – C.D. Dragón
 Diego Areco - Jocoro F.C., C.D. FAS
 Jose Antonio Ayala - Jocoro F.C.
 Néstor Ayala * – C.D. FAS, Once Lobos, Atlético Balboa
 Andres Insfran Britez - C.D. Pasaquina, C.D. Municipal Limeño
 Juan Pablo Caballero – C.D. Municipal Limeño
 Roque Caballero - Jocoro
 Jorge Cáceres - C.D. Municipal Limeño, Jocoro F.C.
 Julián Chávez - C.D. Pasaquina
 Arnulfo Coleman - C.D. Pasaquina
 Julio Cesar Coleman – C.D. FAS
 Miguel Angel Dominguez – Alianza F.C.
 Oswaldo Nelson Duarte – A.D. Isidro Metapán
 Arnaldo Ferreira – C.D. Municipal Limeño
 Edgar Fleitas/Fleytas  – C.D. Dragón
 Oscar Franco - Jocoro
 Lorenzo Rodrigo Frutos - Santa Tecla F.C.
 Gabriel Garcete – A.D. Isidro Metapán, C.D. Municipal Limeño, A.D. Isidro Metapán, C.D. FAS, C.D. Chalatenango, Atletico Balboa
 Marco Luis González - C.D. Chalatenango
 Gustavo Guerreño - C.D. Pasaquina, Alianza F.C., Santa Tecla F.C.
 Didilfo Guerrero – C.D. Municipal Limeño
 Luis Ibarra - Atletico Marte
 Hugo Alexis Oviedo Jara - C.D. Municipal Limeño
 Samuel Jiménez - C.D. Municipal Limeño
 Javier Lezcano - C.D. Pasaquina, C.D. Águila, Platense, C.D. Municipal Limeño
 Luis Carlos Maldonado – C.D. Dragón
 Sandro Melgarejo - C.D. Municipal Limeño, Atletico Marte
 Osvaldo Mendoza – C.D. FAS, A.D. Isidro Metapán
 Jorge Esteban Ortíz – A.D. Isidro Metapán
 Jeremías Pereira - C.D. Municipal Limeño
 Edgar Añazco Riquelme – C.D. Águila
 Jose Luis Rodriguez - Jocoro F.C., C.D. FAS
 Juan Ángel Sosa – Atlético Marte
 Jeyson Joel Vega – C.D. FAS

Peru
 Jahir Camero – C.D. Municipal Limeño, C.D. Dragón, Atletico Balboa
 Germán Carty * – C.D. Chalatenango
 Aldo Cavero – C.D. Municipal Limeño
 Cesar Augusto Charum – C.D. Chalatenango, C.D. Municipal Limeño
 Paul Cominges * – C.D. Águila
 Miguel Curiel - C.D. Aguila
 Antonio Serrano Davila – C.D. FAS
 Frank Palomino – C.D. Luis Angel Firpo
 Pedro Prado – C.D. FAS

Uruguay
 Manuel "Manolo" Abreu – C.D. Luis Ángel Firpo
 Sebastián Abreu * - Santa Tecla F.C.
 Waldemar Acosta - Aguila
 Mauro Aldave – Atletico Marte
 Luis Edgardo Almada Alves – C.D. Águila
 Víctor Avelenda – Municipal Limeno
 Fernando Fajardo Balzani – San Salvador F.C.
 Alcides Eduardo Bandera – A.D. Isidro Metapán, C.D. Atlético Balboa, Atlético Marte
 José Miguel Barreto - Once Deportivo, Santa Tecla
 Diego Benítez – Alianza F.C.
 Andrés Berrueta – San Salvador F.C.
 Juan Dario Bicca – Isidro Metapan 
 Carlos Bueno * - Santa Tecla F.C.
 Santiago Carrera – C.D. FAS
 Gastón Colman - Santa Tecla F.C.
 Gonzalo Camili – Aguila (1999)
 Nicolás Céspedes - Atletico Marte
 José Denis Conde  – Alianza F.C.
 Matías Cresseri – Aguila 
 Rodrigo Cubilla - Chalatenango
 Alejandro Cuneo – C.D. Luis Ángel Firpo
 Alejandro Curbelo * – Alianza F.C.
 Luis Fernando Espíndola – Alianza F.C., San Salvador F.C., Nejapa F.C., Once Municipal
 Nicolás Fagúndez – Aguila, C.D. Sonsonate, A.D. Isidro Metapán 
 Raúl Eduardo Falero – Alianza F.C., Municipal Limeno, San Salvador F.C.
 Darío Ferreira – Alianza F.C.
 Bruno Ferri – Dragon 
 Ignacio Flores – Aguila 
 Ariel Fontela – Alianza F.C.
 Maximiliano Freitas – Alianza F.C.
 Jorge Leonardo Garay – C.D. Dragon (2001), Aguila, Atlético Balboa
 Víctor Rafael García – Alianza F.C., Aguila 
 Sebastián Gutiérrez - Atletico Marte
 Washington Hernández – C.D. Luis Ángel Firpo
 Alejandro Larrea – Alianza F.C.
 Darío Larrosa – C.D. Luis Ángel Firpo, Aguila 
 Jose Mauro Laurindo – C.D. Luis Ángel Firpo
 Andres Martin Lima - C.D. Sonsonate
 Gonzalo da Luz - Aguila 
 Cristhian Maciel - Jocoro F.C.
 Paulo Medina – Aguila 
 Martin Mederos – C.D. Luis Ángel Firpo, UES
 Álvaro Méndez – C.D. Municipal Limeño
 Martín Morales – C.D. FAS
 Cristian Olivera – Alianza F.C., Santa Tecla F.C.
 Claudio Pasadi – Once Lobos
 Carlos Daniel Pimienta  – C.D. Águila
 Jorge Puglia – Alianza F.C.
 Liber Quiñones - Santa Tecla F.C.
 Pablo Enrique Quiñonez – C.D. FAS, Atlético Balboa, Once Lobos
 Jorge Ramírez – A.D. Isidro Metapán, C.D. Sonsonate
 Juan Carlos Reyes – A.D. Isidro Metapán, C.D. Luis Ángel Firpo, Once Municipal, Nejapa F.C., Ateltico Balboa, Juventud Independiente
 Flavio Scarone – Aguila
 Diego Seoane – Aguila 
 Matías Soto - Santa Tecla F.C.
 Alvaro Crucci Silva – Aguila 
 Claudio Ramón Pasadi Silva – C.D. FAS, A.D. Isidro Metapán
 Santiago Risso – Juventud Independiente
 Fabricio Silva – Alianza F.C., Santa Tecla F.C.
 Yari David Silvera – Alianza F.C.
 Alejandro Soler – C.D. FAS
 Sergio Souza - Santa Tecla F.C.
 Paolo Suárez – C.D. FAS, A.D. Isidro Metapán
 Leonardo Sum – C.D. Municipal Limeño
 Marcos Adrian Sum – C.D. Municipal Limeño
 Martín Tejeda – C.D. Luis Ángel Firpo
 Pablo Tiscornia – C.D. Luis Ángel Firpo
 Jesús Toscanini – Juventud Independiente, Alianza F.C., C.D. Municipal Limeno
 Oscar Vallejo – Alianza F.C., San Salvador F.C.
 Christian Vaquero – Alianza F.C., Santa Tecla F.C., C.D. Dragon, C.D. Chalatenango
 José Pablo “Rulo” Varela – Alianza F.C.
 Walter Vázquez – Alianza F.C.
 Joaquín Verges - C.D. Águila, Atletico Marte
 Diego Sebastián Viera – Alianza F.C.
 Carlos Edgar Villarreal – C.D. Dragon, C.D. FAS, Alianza F.C., Atlético Balboa, C.D. Municipal Limeño
 Christian Yeladian – Alianza F.C.

Venezuela
 Daniel de Oliveira * – C.D. Luis Ángel Firpo
 Luis Artubes Iseles – C.D. Dragón
 Pierre Alexandre Pluchino Galuppo – C.D. Luis Ángel Firpo
 César Iván González – C.D. Luis Ángel Firpo
 Rafael Ponzo – UES

North & Central America, Caribbean – CONCACAF

Belize
 Krisean Lopez - Platense

Canada
 Adam Bisgaard - A.D. Chalatenango

Costa Rica
 Jeremy Araya – Juventud Independiente
 Yosimar Arias (*)  - Sonsonate
 Evance Benwell – San Salvador F.C.
 Enar Bolaños – Alacranes Del Norte
 Bernard Mullins Campbell (*)   – FAS
 Johan Condega - Sonsonate
 Sergio Cordoba – Chalatenango
 Erick Corrales – Nejapa F.C.
 Rolando Corella  – FAS
 David Diach (*) – Firpo
 Allan Duarte – UES
 José Luis Gónzález – Chalatenango
 Donny Grant Zamora (*)  – FAS
 Floyd Guthrie – Firpo
 Kervin Lacey  – Limeno
 Johnny Woodly Lambert – Alianza
 Erick Marín – Firpo
 Luis Martínez  – Limeno
 Michael Myers – Aguila
 Darryl Parker - Firpo
 David Sandoval Peña – ADET, San Salvador F.C.
 Gustavo Peña – UES
 Carlos Rodríguez – Atlético Balboa, San Salvador F.C.
 Carlos Pancita Rodríguez Marín – Limeno
 Rodolfo Rodríguez (*)  – FAS
 Erick Scott (*)  – Firpo
 José Alberto Solano – San Luis Talpa
 Alejandro Sequeira (*)  – Aguila
 William Vargas – Chalatenango

Cuba
 Julio Maya – Atlético Marte
 Luis Paradela (*) - Jocoro, Chalatenango
 Yaikel Perez (*) – Alianza, Aguila
 Yosel Piedra - Chalatenango

Dominican Republic
 Pedro Aquino – Atlético Marte
 Jonathan Faña  (*)  – Alianza
 Óscar Mejía  (*)  – Atlético Marte, Firpo
 Gabriel Ernesto Núñez  (*)  – Alianza, Independiente, Atletico Marte
 Luis Sánchez – Atlético Marte
 Francisco Vásquez – Juventud Independiente

Guatemala
 Julio Ariz – Aguila
 Edward Cocherari (*) – ADET, Alianza, San Salvador F.C.
 Franklin Eduardo García - Sonsonate
 Cristian Noriega (*) – FAS
 Luis Tatuaca (*) - Atletico Marte

Haiti
 Johnny Descolines (*) – Isidro Metapan

Honduras
 Ernesto Noel Aquino – Atletico Balboa, Isidro Metapan, Once Municipal
 Aly Arriola – Limeno
 Eduardo Arriola (*) – Dragon, FAS
 Johnny Ávila – Isidro Metapan
 Bonel Ávila – Vista Hermosa
 Marcio Ayala – Dragon
 Roberto Bailey Jnr – C.D. Atlético Balboa
 Libardo Barbajal – Once Municipal
 Arlie Bernardez - Pasaquina
 Alfred Boden – San Luis Talpa
 Camilo Bonilla – C.D. Atlético Balboa
 Marvin Orlando Brown  – Isidro Metapan
 Orvin Cabrera – Firpo
 Mauricio Rodolfo Castaneda  – Once Municipal
 Edenilson Paulino Castillo - Isidro Metapan
 Ramon Alberto Castillo – Atlético Marte
 Jairy Crisanto - Jocoro F.C.
 Arnold Cruz (*) – Aguila
 Héctor Amaya Fernández – Dragon (1999)
 Noel Flores – Isidro Metapan
 Gustavo Adolfo Gallegos  – Limeno
 Martín Eduardo García – C.D. Juventud Olimpica Metalio
 Marlon Godoy – Isidro Metapan
 Alberto Guity – Dragon
 Carlos Alexander Guity (*) – C.D. Juventud Olimpica Metalio, Limeno
 Óscar Lagos (*) – Dragon
 Emerson Lalin – Chalatenango, Limeno
 Ovidio Lanza  - Jocoro F.C.
 Julio César de León (*) – Limeno
 José Luis López – Chalatenango
 Luciano Valerio Harry – Vista Hermosa
 Miguel Mariano – FAS, Limeno
 Henry Josué Martínez – Nejapa
 Walter Martínez (*) – FAS
 Arnold Josue Melendez - Jocoro F.C.
 Jorge Martínez Ogalde – Santa Clara
 Christian Mitri – C.D. Arcense
 Junior Padilla - Jocoro F.C.
 Milton Geovanny Palacios - Audaz
 Mario Pavón – Santa Clara, Arcense
 Fabian Andres Perez – Limeno
 Rafael Fabricio Pérez (*) – Atletico Marte
 Francisco Ramírez (*) – Vista Hermosa
 Luis Alfredo Ramírez (*) – Limeno
 Wilmer Ramos – Once Municipal
 Enrique Reneau (*) – C.D. Atlético Balboa, Chalatenango
 Francis Reyes – Limeno
 Néstor Steve Reyes – Juventud Independiente
 Elison Rivas - Aguila
 Abel Rodríguez (*) – Alianza
 Germán Rodríguez – Limeno (1999), Dragon, San Salvador F.C., C.D. Arcense
 Henry Romero - Jocoro
 Christian Santamaría (*) – Limeno
 Hugo Sarmiento – C.D. Atlético Balboa, San Luis Talpa, ADET, Isidro Metapan, Vista Hermosa, Independiente Nacional 1906
 Elvis Scott (*) – Alianza
 Nissi Sauceda - Jocoro F.C.
 Fabio Ulloa (*) – Aguila
 Eugenio Valerio – Limeno, Atletico Balboa 
 Pompilio Cacho Valerio (*) – Vista Hermosa, C.D. Luis Ángel Firpo
 Gerson Vásquez – Aguila
 Jorge Guillermo Wagner  – Isidro Metapan, Arcense, Aguila
 Franklin Vinosis Webster – C.D. Atlético Balboa, Chalatenango, Alacranes del Norte, Vista Hermosa, Atlético Balboa, San Salvador F.C.
 Georgie Welcome (*) – Dragon
 Brayan Zuñiga - Jocoro
 Clayvin Zúniga – Limeno, FAS

Jamaica
 Nicholas Addlery (*) – Aguila
 Jermaine Anderson (*) – Aguila
 Kemal Beckford - Chalatenango, Jocoro F.C.
 Girvon Ricardo Brown – Isidro Metapan
 Craig Foster - Chalatenango, Once Deportivo, Santa Tecla F.C.
 Sean Fraser (*) – Once Municipal, Alianza, Dragon
 Garrick Gordon – Municipal Limeno, Vista Hermosa, Atlético Marte, UES
 Wolde Harris (*) – FAS
 Kenroy Howell - Dragon, Chalatenango
 Jabari Hylton - Once Deportivo
 Jeremie Lynch (*) – Firpo
 Kemal Orlando Malcolm - Chalatenango
 Chevone Marsh - Chalatenango
 Romeo Ovando Parkes (*) – Isidro Metapan
 Akeem Priestley (*) – Isidro Metapan
 Kamoy Kadeem Simpson - Once Deportivo
 Keithy Simpson (*) - C.D. Águila
 François Swaby – Firpo
 McKauly Tulloch  - UES, Sonsonate, Isidro Metapan, Audaz

Mexico
 Joel Almeida - Santa Tecla, El Vencedor, Firpo
 Jairo Araujo – Alianza
 Armando García Arechiga – Municipal Limeno, Firpo
 Roberto Clemente Avila – Atlético Marte
 Julían Barragán – San Salvador F.C.
 Jahir Barraza - Santa Tecla, Aguila
 Jose Luis Calderon - Once Deportivo
 Diego Castellanos – FAS
 Elio Castro - Santa Tecla
 Alejandro Dautt - Santa Tecla, Once Deportivo
 Carlos Félix - Chalatenango
 Juan Carlos Enríquez – FAS
 Armando García – Municipal Limeno (1999)
 Marco Granados - Once Deportivo
 Daniel Guzman - Atletico Marte
 Pablo Hütt – Once Municipal, Chalatenango
 David López – Isidro Metapan
 Manuel Luna – Chalatenango, UES
 Luis Madrigal - FAS
 Óscar Maturín – Nejapa
 Luis Ángel Mendoza - FAS
 Andrés Ortega Mora – Atlético Marte
 Adrian Muro - Once Deportivo
 José Luis Osorio Aguilar – Chalatenango, Atlético Marte, Alianza , Nejapa
 Ceveriano García Palominos – Vista Hermosa
 Gullit Peña - FAS
 José Manuel Piñeiro - Pasaquina
 Marvin Piñón - Once Deportivo
 Felipe Ponce Ramírez – Alianza, Municipal Limeno
 José Manuel Rivera - Sonsonate
 Ismael Rodríguez (*) – Aguila
 Ramón Rodríguez – Atlético Marte
 Omar Rosas - Platense
 Jesus Everardo Rubio - Chalatenango
 Hugo Sánchez Portugal - Once Municipal
 Edgar Solis - Once Deportivo
 Ulises Tavares - Sonsonate
 Hilario Tristán- Sonsonate
 German Ramírez Urenda - Isidro Metapan
 Dieter Vargas - Once Deportivo, Chalatenango
 Francisco Javier Vargas- Atlético Marte
 Roberto Ventura – Municipal Limeno

Nicaragua
 Armando Collado (*) – Nejapa, Alianza
 Luis Fernando Copete (*) - Sonsonate, Once Deportivo, Isidro Metapan
 Cyril Errington (*) - UES, Alianza F.C., Firpo
 Henry Niño (*) - Chalatenango
 Emilio Palacios (*) – Independiente Nacional 1906
 Wilber Sánchez (*) – San Salvador
 Danny Téllez (*) – Dragon
 Hamilton West (*) - ADET

Panama
 Nelson Barahona - Firpo
 Anthony Basile (*) – Once Municipal
 Rolando Blackburn (*) – FAS
 Eduardo Jiménez Blis – Aguila
 Roberto Brown (*) – FAS
 Miguel Camargo (*) – Aguila
 Anel Canales (*) – Once Municipal, Alianza, Chalatenango, Isidro Metapan, Firpo
 Roberto Chen (*) - FAS
 Richard Dixon (*) - Aguila
 Rogelio Juarez – Santa Tecla
 Abdiel Macea - Sonsonate, Once Deportivo
 Julio Medina III (*) – Aguila
 Luis Mendoza – Once Municipal, Firpo 
 Nicolás Muñoz (*) – Alianza, Aguila, FAS, Vista Hermosa, Chalatenango, Firpo, Pasaquina, El Vencedor, Municipal Limeno
  Temistocles Perez – FAS
 Josimar Gomez Piggott - Sonsonate
 Percival Piggott (*) – Firpo
 Víctor Herrera Piggott (*) – Firpo
 Armando Polo (*) - Sonsonate, Santa Tecla, Firpo
 Francisco Portillo (*) – Alianza, Once Municipal, San Salvador F.C.
 Ameth Ramírez - Isidro Metapan
 Gabriel Rios – Dragon, UES
 Rolando Rojas – Vista Hermosa
 Orlando Rodríguez (*) – FAS, Alianza
 Publio Rodriguez – Once Municipal
 Joel Solanilla (*) – FAS
 Juan Ramón Solís (*) – Aguila
 Alberto Zapata (*) – Alianza

Puerto Rico
 Hector Ramos (*) – Isidro Metapan, Aguila, Alianza

Saint Kitts and Nevis
 Devaughn Elliott (*) – Pasaquina

Trinidad and Tobago
 Jomoul Francois - Independiente
 Jamal Jack (*) - Dragon, Jocoro
 Ricardo John (*) - Firpo
 Weslie John (*) - UES
 Samuel Kordell – Pasaquina, Chalatenango
 Yohance Marshall (*) – Juventud Independiente
 Leston Paul (*) - Pasaquina
 Willis Plaza (*) - Alianza
 James Dwane Ronaldo (*) - Pasaquina
 Vladimir Henderson Suite – Atlético Marte
 Jomal Williams (*) - Isidro Metapan, Firpo, Aguila, Once Deportivo

United States
 Eddie Ababio – Aguila
 Benyam Philippe Astorga  – Aguila
 Matthias Bonvehi – Isidro Metapan
 Wilfredo Cienfuegos - Limeno
 Oscar Sorto - Santa Tecla
 Ricardo Velazco - Isidro Metapan
 David White - Santa Clara

Europe – UEFA

France
 Hugo Bargas - FAS

Germany
 Marcus Kothner – Limeno
 Rugvao Leichiz – Aguila

Italy
 Ricardo Bellancanzone – Atlético Marte

Spain
 Gregori Diaz - Isidro Metapan
 Carlos Martínez Aibar – Luis Angel Firpo
 Juan Ramón García Martínez - Isidro Metapan
 Manu Dimas - Isidro Metapan

NotesNotes:References:'''

External links
https://web.archive.org/web/20120928201535/http://www.elsalvador.com/noticias/2001/8/12/DEPORTES/depor5.html (Spanish) (2001 Players in the league foreign players included)
http://www.elsalvador.com/enlajugada/6edicion/nota5.html (Spanish) (foreign players in El Salvador and talks about Colombian players)
 https://www.elgrafico.com/futbol/Los-639-extranjeros-en-torneos-cortos-de-Liga-Mayor-20160620-0005.html (Spanish) (foreign players in El Salvador from 1998 to 2016)

El Salvador
Primera División de Fútbol Profesional players
 
Association football player non-biographical articles